Mukha (International title: Facade / ) is a 2005 Philippine television drama series broadcast by GMA Network. The series is the first installment of Now and Forever. Directed by Mac Alejandre, it stars Ryza Cenon, LJ Reyes and JC de Vera. It premiered on March 14, 2005. The series concluded on June 10, 2005 with a total of 63 episodes. It was replaced by Ganti in its timeslot.

Cast and characters

Lead cast
 Ryza Cenon as Mae
 LJ Reyes as Melody
 Valerie Concepcion as Karen
 CJ Muere as Vince
 JC de Vera as William
 Mike Tan as Paolo

Supporting cast
 Princess Punzalan as Dulce
 Amy Austria as Fatima
 Joel Torre as Guido
 Alicia Alonzo as Juanita
 Glenda Garcia as Vivian
 Chinggoy Alonzo as Miguel/Manuel
 Susan Africa as Leonor
 Czarina de Leon as Georgina
 Carlo Maceda as Edward

Accolades

References

External links
 

2005 Philippine television series debuts
2005 Philippine television series endings
Filipino-language television shows
GMA Network drama series
Philippine romance television series
Television shows set in the Philippines